Sir Christopher John "Jack" Dewhurst  (2 July 1920 – 1 December 2006) was a British gynecologist. He was Professor and Head of Obstetrics and Gynaecology at the Royal Postgraduate Medical School, London University, from 1967 to 1985. He served as president of the Royal College of Obstetricians and Gynaecologists from 1975 to 1978. 

Sir Christopher Dewhurst was knighted in 1978 for his work in medicine. He is considered to be one of the founders of the medical specialty of pediatric and adolescent gynecology. Sir Dewhurst published 109 peer-reviewed publications and co-wrote 13 medical textbooks during his career.

Sir Dewhurst chaired the 1st International Symposium on Gender Identity in London, United Kingdom in 1969 and provided the opening remarks for the conference.

Selected publications

Books

Latest editions

Book chapters

Journal articles

References

1920 births
2006 deaths
English gynaecologists
English medical researchers
Academics of the University of London
Alumni of the University of Manchester
Fellows of the Royal College of Obstetricians and Gynaecologists
Knights Bachelor
Fellows of the Royal College of Surgeons
Medical doctors from Lancashire